Ireland is an island surrounded by water, with a  coastline. This list catalogues about 400 of the coastal landforms of the island including bays, estuaries, harbours, headlands, and many others. Most offshore features such as islands, stags (stacks), and rocks are omitted but are presented at List of islands of Ireland. A list of beaches is available at List of beaches in Ireland.

Some landform names appear more than once and an analysis of duplicate names follows the table.



Landform sequence: Relative Location Index (RLI column)
The first view of this table shows landforms in an anti-clockwise direction around the Irish coast, starting at the northern extremity of the Inishowen Peninsula and proceeding from north, to west, to south, and to east. After the table is sorted in various ways by the viewer, the Relative Location Index (RLI) column allows it to be restored to its original order by sorting the RLI in ascending sequence. Alternatively, the landforms may be viewed in the clockwise direction (north, east, south, west) by sorting the RLI column in descending order.

Duplicate table entries
1. Some landforms appear more than once when they are shared by more than one county (inter-county landforms): the Shannon Estuary, for example, is shared by counties Clare, Limerick, and Kerry. 2. Some different features have the same name, such as Mizen Head in Cork and Mizen Head in Wicklow. 3. Others have similar names such as Tullagh Bay in Donegal and Tullaghan Bay in Mayo.

See also

 List of beaches in Ireland
 List of islands of Ireland
 List of ports in Ireland
 List of Irish counties by coastline
 List of islands of County Mayo

References

Coastal